Daphnis protrudens is a moth of the  family Sphingidae.

Distribution 
It is known from Indonesia, Papua New Guinea and Queensland.

Description 
Adults have wings with a bold pattern of pale and dark brown. There is a contrasting pair of dark brown and white bands across the first abdominal segment. It is distinguishable from all other Daphnis species by the violet-toned dark chocolate brown marginal band on the forewing underside. The forewing upperside has a proximal edge of median brown which is not sharply defined.

Biology 
The larvae have been recorded feeding on Timonius timon.

Subspecies
Daphnis protrudens protrudens
Daphnis protrudens lecourti Cadiou, 1997 (Sulawesi)

References

Daphnis (moth)
Moths described in 1874